is a quarter of Hamburg, Germany, in the borough of Eimsbüttel. It is located on the northwestern boundaries of the borough and of the city.

Geography
Eidelstedt borders the quarters of Schnelsen, Niendorf, Stellingen, as well as Bahrenfeld and Lurup in the neighbouring Altona borough.

History
In 1266/69 Eidelstedt was first recorded as a village, then under the names of Eilstede, Eylstedt or Eylenstede. The part - in the name refers to a Saxonian foundation, meaning safe settlement or safe residence, which was founded by a first settler named Eyler. Another explanation derives from Ilenstätten, referring to a place (German: Stätte), where medicinal leeches (German: Egel, Blutegel, Low German: Ilen) could be found, namely in a stream called Mühlenau and the pond of Mühlenteich in the village. In 1937, the village was incorporated into Hamburg by the Greater Hamburg Act, which came into force in 1938.

Politics

Transportation
The Hamburg-Altona–Kiel railway marks the south western boundaries of the quarter, with Hamburg S-Bahn commuter trains serve Elbgaustraße and Eidelstedt station; the latter is also served by AKN commuter trains. AKN railcars also call Eidelstedt Zentrum station.

References

External links

 Eidelstedt, Hamburg.de

Quarters of Hamburg
Eimsbüttel